Ferdinando Pulton (1536–1618) was an English legal writer, the first to attempt a comprehensive book treating criminal law. This was his De pace Regis et regni, first published in 1609.

Pulton belonged to Lincoln's Inn, but he was a Roman Catholic, so that at that time a legal career was denied to him. He was a student at Christ's College, University of Cambridge.

He wrote also a Collection of Sundrie Statutes (1618). This is credited with making the term Star Chamber common in use. An earlier work was his Abstract of all the Penal Statutes.

He resided in Bourton, Buckinghamshire.

References
 Concise Dictionary of National Biography

Notes

1536 births
1618 deaths
English legal writers
16th-century English writers
16th-century male writers
English Roman Catholics